Al Jazirah Al Hamra is a town to the south of the city of Ras Al Khaimah in the United Arab Emirates. It is known for its collection of abandoned houses and other buildings, including a mosque, which are widely believed locally to be haunted. The town was ruled by the Zaab tribe, which was rehoused in Abu Dhabi following a dispute with the Ruler of Ras Al Khaimah.

History 
The town was originally a tidal island and, by 1830, was home to some 200 people mostly occupied in pearl fishing. At the time, it was a dependency of Sharjah.

The Sheikh of Jazira Al Hamra in 1820, Rajib bin Ahmed al-Zaabi, was one of four independent signatories to the original 1820 treaty between the Trucial States and the British, following the 1819 punitive expedition mounted against Ras Al Khaimah by the British. In the treaty, the sheikhdom was named as 'Jourat Al Kamra'.

The town has also been called Jazirah Al Zaab, as it was predominantly settled by members of the Zaab (some 500 houses at the turn of the 20th century). A tidal island, it was split into two sections, the small northern quarter of Umm Awaimir and the southern Manakh. Although the Zaab had some 500 sheep and 150 cattle at the time, there were no palm groves, although the tribe tended groves at Khatt. Jazirah Al Hamrah maintained a fleet of some 25 pearling boats, the principal source of income for the tribe until the crash of the pearl market in the late 1920s.

Following an agreement between Sheikh Khalid bin Ahmad Al Qasimi of Sharjah and Sheikh Sultan bin Salim Al Qasimi of Ras Al Khaimah in 1914, the town became part of Ras Al Khaimah, but was often in dispute with the Ruler. This led, in 1968, to a dispute with Sheikh Saqr bin Mohammed Al Qasimi of Ras Al Khaimah which resulted in the majority of the tribe accepting an offer from Sheikh Zayed bin Sultan Al Nahyan to move to Abu Dhabi. This movement left behind an almost completely abandoned village which had housed some 2,500 people.

Zaab 
The last Al Zaab Sharif (mayor) of Jazirah Al Hamra was Hussein Bin Rahma Al Zaabi, who was later the Sharif of Al Zaab area in Abu Dhabi. His eldest son Rahma was the United Arab Emirates ambassador to many Arab countries.

In popular culture 
Portions of 6 Underground for Netflix were shot in Al Hamra in 2018. Director Michael Bay said about the place: "We shot in Al Hamra – an ancient ghost city they called it – that we played for Afghanistan. And literally right around the corner we played another part for Nigeria... It’s very versatile to have a place where literally like five minutes away it’s like a different country".

References

Reportedly haunted locations in the United Arab Emirates
Villages in the United Arab Emirates
Populated places in the Emirate of Ras Al Khaimah